Reginald of Bar may refer to
Reginald I, Count of Bar (1080-1149), count of Bar
Reginald II, Count of Bar (1122-1170), count of Bar
Reginald of Bar (bishop of Chartres) (d. 1217), bishop of Chartres
Reginald of Bar (bishop of Metz) (d. 1316), bishop of Metz